In the 2009–10 season, CR Belouizdad competed in the National 1 for the 44th season, as well as the Algerian Cup and the CAF Confederation Cup.

Squad list
Players and squad numbers last updated on 18 November 2009.Note: Flags indicate national team as has been defined under FIFA eligibility rules. Players may hold more than one non-FIFA nationality.

Competitions

Overview

{| class="wikitable" style="text-align: center"
|-
!rowspan=2|Competition
!colspan=8|Record
!rowspan=2|Started round
!rowspan=2|Final position / round
!rowspan=2|First match	
!rowspan=2|Last match
|-
!
!
!
!
!
!
!
!
|-
| National 1

|  
| 9th
| 6 August 2009
| 31 May 2010
|-
| Algerian Cup

| Round of 64 
| Round of 16
| 26 December 2009
| 16 March 2010
|-
| CAF Confederation Cup

| Preliminary round
| Play-off round
| 12 February 2010
| 31 July 2010
|-
! Total

National

League table

Results summary

Results by round

Matches

Algerian Cup

Confederation Cup

Preliminary round

First round

Second round

Play-off round

Squad information

Playing statistics

|-
! colspan=12 style=background:#dcdcdc; text-align:center| Goalkeepers

|-
! colspan=12 style=background:#dcdcdc; text-align:center| Defenders

|-
! colspan=12 style=background:#dcdcdc; text-align:center| Midfielders

|-
! colspan=12 style=background:#dcdcdc; text-align:center| Forwards

|-
! colspan=12 style=background:#dcdcdc; text-align:center| Players transferred out during the season

Goalscorers
Includes all competitive matches. The list is sorted alphabetically by surname when total goals are equal.

Transfers

In

Out

References

External links

CR Belouizdad seasons
Algerian football clubs 2009–10 season